Michael Joseph Kaniecki, SJ (April 13, 1935 –  August 6, 2000) was an American prelate of the Roman Catholic Church who served as bishop of the Diocese of Fairbanks in Alaska from 1985 to 2000.

Biography 
Michael Kaniecki was born on April 13, 1935, in Detroit, Michigan. He professed religious vows as a Jesuit, and was ordained a priest for the Society of Jesus by Bishop Francis Valentine Allen on June 5, 1965.

Coadjutor Bishop and Bishop of Fairbanks 
On March 8, 1984, Pope John Paul II named Kaniecki to be the coadjutor bishop of the Diocese of Fairbanks. He was consecrated on May 1, 1984, by Bishop Robert Whelan. The co-consecrators were Archbishop Francis Hurley and Bishop Michael Kenny.  Kaniecki automatically became bishop of Fairbanks on June 1, 1985, with the resignation of Bishop Whelan;  Kaniecki was installed on July 28, 1985.  

Kaniecki was known for his frequent "Letters to the Editor" sent to the Fairbanks Daily News-Miner condemning homosexuality.

Kaniecki served the diocese for a total of 16 years. Michael Kaniecki died suddenly on August 6, 2000, of a massive heart attack before celebrating a mass in Emmonak, Alaska.

References

1935 births
2000 deaths
Roman Catholic bishops of Fairbanks
20th-century Roman Catholic bishops in the United States
American people of Polish descent
Clergy from Detroit
Jesuit bishops
20th-century American Jesuits